"Cul de Sac" is a song written by Irish singer-songwriter Van Morrison. It first appeared as the seventh track on Morrison's 1974 album Veedon Fleece, and was released as the B-side to the single "Bulbs".

Lyrics and instrumentation 
The song roughly describes traveling on the road, emigration and homecoming.:

"Oh, I traveled far
The nearest star
And Mount Palomar, Palomar, Palomar, Palomar
[…]
And when they all,
All go home
Down the cobblestones
You will double back
To a cul de sac"

The lyrics are sparse and added lightly, accenting the melody of the song. "Cul de Sac" is performed in 3/4 time.

An alternate version was released in 2009(?), and the lyrics are slightly different, as follows:

In the cul de sac
Soft clean eider down
Lay you down a while
And take your rest.

It’s been much too long
Since you drifted into song
Relax yourself
And hide away.

I travelled far
The nearest star
Mount Palomar
And we don’t care who you know,
It’s what you are
and who you are.

And they all go home 
Down the cobblestones
You can double back
To a cul de sac

Background and recording
"Cul de Sac" was recorded with a separate lineup of musicians than the rest of Veedon Fleece. "Cul de Sac" along with "Bulbs" was recut at Mercury Studios in New York a few months after the main recording for the album took place. It was made with musicians with whom Morrison had never worked before: guitarist John Tropea, bassist Joe Macho and drummer Allen Schwarzberg. It contrasted slightly with the rest of the album as it was given more of a rock music treatment.

Release and reception
"Cul de Sac" was chosen as the B-side to the single "Bulbs", which was released in 1974 as the lead single for Veedon Fleece. In the UK, it was replaced by "Who Was That Masked Man".

In his book Van Morrison: Inarticulate Speech of the Heart, John Collis writes:

An alternate version of "Cul de Sac" was released in 2008 on CD.

Personnel
Van Morrison – vocals
John Tropea – guitar
Jef Labes – piano
Joe Macho – bass
Allen Schwarzberg – drums

Notes

References
 
Heylin, Clinton (2003). Can You Feel the Silence? Van Morrison: A New Biography,  Chicago Review Press

External links
[ "Cul de Sac" allmusic review]

Van Morrison songs
Songs written by Van Morrison
1974 songs
Song recordings produced by Van Morrison